Buivydiškės Manor is a former residential manor in Buivydiškės, Vilnius District Municipality, Lithuania. The last users of the main building was Buivydiškės Primary School. Currently the main palace is for sale.

References

Manor houses in Lithuania
Classicism architecture in Lithuania